Safe in the Hands of Love is the third studio album by American experimental electronic music artist Yves Tumor. It was released on September 5, 2018 by Warp Records.

Release
Tumor released "Noid" as the first single from the album on July 24, 2018, and followed it with "Licking an Orchid" featuring James K on August 29, and "Lifetime" on September 3. They shared the track "Economy of Freedom" the following day, and surprise released the album digitally the next day with no prior announcement. It is their first album released on Warp Records. Physical editions were released on October 12.

Composition

Musical style
Tumor's former tracks had nestled themselves into the realms of ambient, noise and sound collage. Their 2017 track "Limerence" was lauded and was included in the ambient music compilation mono no aware, alongside various other musicians.

A "benchmark in experimental music", the eclectic nature of Safe in the Hands has resulted in various descriptors for the genres it spans, with it noted for sounding "freer to move than most," going "from sultry ambient to future soul, psychedelic pop, and everything in between."

Tracks 
Instrumental opener "Faith in Nothing Except in Salvation" features "film-noir jazz trumpet" supplied by Will Artope. It is the first of three tracks to include Artope performing trumpet. The result would be "an off-kilter take on anthemic jazz" "that lends a sense of foreboding" to Safe in the Hands. The second track "Economy of Freedom" features contributions to the song's writing and arrangements from dark ambient musician Croatian Amor. Starting "with gauzy, resonant synths before dipping into ambient house", the song includes drum hits that "feel like something already dead hitting the floor" and "a lone vocal melody for the coda."

Critical reception

At Metacritic, which assigns a normalized rating out of 100 to reviews from mainstream publications, Safe in the Hands of Love received an average score of 89, based on 9 reviews, indicating "universal acclaim". Eoin Murray of The Quietus stated that "Yves Tumor has let assertiveness, assuredness and vulnerability run wild within him for Safe in the Hands of Love and the result is magisterial and deeply engaging." Sypros Statis of PopMatters wrote, "What pushes Safe in the Hands of Love beyond the producer's previous works is the emotion that the record transmits. No matter if the synths are harsh, or the rhythm section arrives with the perfect groove, this is a work filled with an emotive purpose, and it is that core that makes it such a wonderful listen."

Tiny Mix Tapes writer Sam Goldner said, "Bowie's only consistent trajectory has been one of tearing down his mythos even as his builds it, and his latest manages to knock down yet another wall as he steps more fully into the light than he's ever dared tread before. On Safe in the Hands of Love, Yves Tumor isn't concerned with being "experimental;" he's simply concerned with being." Resident Advisors Matthew McDermott wrote, "Yves Tumor joins the ranks of Arca and SOPHIE at the millennial generation's pop vanguard, a group whose fluid approach to music and imagery is eradicating the gap between underground and mainstream." The Wire said, "Sometimes the sensuousness of Serpent Music is missed, but Tumor's drive to take this radically new music to audiences as big as Blake's, Ocean's or even Radiohead's is exhilarating." MusicOMH critic Ben Devlin called the album "a fascinating synthesis of rock, plunderphonics, bass music and noise from an artist that remains stubbornly undefinable."

In his rave review for Pitchfork, Jayson Greene wrote, "You get the sense, maybe, that Tumor is carrying around other people's secrets, and that Safe in the Hands of Love is so cavernous-sounding, in part, to accommodate them. Holding all of this together is a stew of feelings—dread, sensuousness, ecstasy, terror—that melt into a mood so pungent and pervasive that people who grew up inside all kinds of different music will be beckoned towards it. Ambient electronic, dream-pop, experimental noise, '90s R&B, even late-'90s alt-rock—Tumor's music is fluid and generous enough to contain it all."

Accolades

Safe in the Hands of Love was ranked the 50th best release of the year in The Wire magazine's annual critics' poll.

Track listing

Sample credits
 "Faith in Nothing Except in Salvation" contains a sample of "Swahililand" written and recorded by Ahmad Jamal
 "Noid" contains samples of "Grace", written by Ronnie Laws and Roxanne J. Seeman and recorded by Sylvia St. James
 "Let the Lioness in You Flow Freely" contains a sample of "Angel Fire", written and recorded by Jan Haflin

Personnel
Credits adapted from the liner notes of Safe in the Hands of Love.

Musicians

 Yves Tumor – vocals; arrangement 
 Croatian Amor – arrangement 
 Will Artope – trumpet 
 Luke Niccoli – bass guitar 
 Evan Johns – drums 
 Andreas Emanuel – electric guitar ; additional electric guitar 
 James K – vocals ; additional violin 
 Derek Stein – cello 
 James Ferraro – additional grand piano 
 Oxhy – vocals 
 Jon Peven – additional percussion

Technical personnel

 Yves Tumor – production
 Justin Raisen – co-production ; engineering
 Mahssa Taghinia – executive production, management
 Luke Niccoli – additional production, additional engineering, additional editing
 Puce Mary – additional production 
 Paul Corley – mixing
 Dave Cooley – mastering

Artwork

 Yves Tumor – creative direction, models casting
 Isamaya Ffrench – creative direction, art direction, makeup
 Mahssa Taghinia – creative direction
 Collin Fletcher – design
 Bliss Serenity Resting – logo, additional design
 Evanie Frausto – hair
 Midland Agency – models casting
 Nick Royal – wardrobe, style
 Jordan Hemingway – photography, video, production

Release history

References

2018 albums
Warp (record label) albums
Albums produced by Justin Raisen
Yves Tumor albums
Experimental pop albums